Anne Dickmann (born 12 February 1958) is a German rower. She competed in the women's quadruple sculls event at the 1984 Summer Olympics.

References

External links
 

1958 births
Living people
German female rowers
Olympic rowers of West Germany
Rowers at the 1984 Summer Olympics
Sportspeople from Düsseldorf